The Battle of Kruty took place on January 29 or 30, 1918 , near Kruty railway station (today the village of Pamiatne, Nizhyn Raion, Chernihiv Oblast), about  northeast of Kyiv, Ukraine, which at the time was part of Nezhinsky Uyezd of Chernigov Governorate.

Overview

Order of battle
Ukrainian forces (D. Nosenko)
 1st Student Company (Sich Riflemen auxiliary kurin) - Petro Omelchenko (fatally wounded) (116 soldiers) was split into four platoons
 Cadet Corps of the 1st Ukrainian military school of Bohdan Khmelnytskyi - Averkiy Honcharenko (~200 soldiers)
 Hlukhiv Free Cossacks (80 soldiers)
Cavalry detachment
 Made-up armed train (consisted of artillery gun on a flatcar) - S.Loshchenko
 Armored train - M.Yartsev (wounded), withdrew to Nizhyn

Russian forces (Mikhail Muravyov)<ref name=known_unknown>Kovalchuk, M. Battle of Kruty: known and known pages. Ukrayinska Pravda (Historic Pravda). 29 January 2015 ( original source)]</ref>
 1st Revolutionary Army (Komdiv Pavel Yegorov) - 1,500
 Baltic sailors of Remnyov
 1st Petrograd Red Guards
1st battalion - Lifanov (wounded)
2nd battalion - Vorobyov
 1st Moscow Red Guards - Ye.Lapidus
 Armored train No.2
 2nd Revolutionary Army (Komdiv Reingold Berzin)
 436th Novo-Ladoga Regiment
 534th Novo-Kyiv Regiment
 detachment of Baltic sailors
 Lenin armored train

Brief description
As Bolshevik forces of about 4,000 men, commanded by Mikhail Muravyov, advanced toward Kyiv, a small Ukrainian unit of 400 soldiers of the Bakhmach garrison (about 300 of which were students), commanded initially by Captain F. Tymchenko, withdrew from Bakhmach to a small railroad station Kruty midway towards Nizhyn. The small unit consisted mainly of the Student Battalion (Kurin) of Sich Riflemen, a unit of the Khmelnytsky Cadet School, and a Free Cossacks company.

Just before the assault Tymchenko was replaced by D. Nosenko. Tymchenko left for Nizhyn in attempt to recruit the locally quartered Shevchenko Regiment (800 soldiers) on the Ukrainian side. On January 30, 1918 the Shevchenko regiment sided with the Soviet regime, the news of which forced the Ukrainian garrison of Kruty hastily to withdraw. Over half of the 400 men were killed during the battle, which lasted up to five hours. In the Soviet historiography the battle is mistakenly dated on January 29, 1918 and confused with the Plysky rail station skirmish (:uk:Плиски (станція)). 

The Haidamaka Kish of Symon Petlyura (300 soldiers) that rushed to reinforce the Kruty garrison and was delayed due to the Darnytsia railworkers sabotage and stopped in close vicinity at Bobryk railway station. They eventually turned back to Kyiv due to the Bolshevik's Arsenal Uprising that occurred on the same day.

Aftermath
Eighteen of the students were re-buried at Askold's Grave in the centre of Kyiv after the return of the Tsentralna Rada to the capital in March 1918. At the funeral the then President of the Ukrainian People's Republic, Mykhailo Hrushevsky, called every one of the 400 students who fought in the battle, heroes. Poet Pavlo Tychyna wrote "To the memory of the thirties" about the heroic death of the students.

After the fall of the Ukrainian People's Republic the bodies of the students were moved to the Lukyanivske Cemetery in Kyiv.

Ukrainian legacy
The true story of the battle was hidden by the Soviet Government. Only recently, a monument was set up to commemorate the 80th anniversary of the Battle of Kruty at Askold's Grave, and a commemorative hryvnia coin was minted. In 2006, the Kruty Heroes Monument was erected on the site of the historic battle. The battle is remembered each year on or around January 29.

On 1 March 2022, the armed forces of Ukraine successfully defended the area around Kruty from a Russian army attack during the 2022 Russian invasion of Ukraine, with the Russians losing nearly 200 men. Before the fighting, Russian soldiers took photos near the Memorial to the Heroes of Kruty, and fired on it.

Important personalities

 Leonid Butkevych, the youngest soldier who was in the sixth grade
 Yakiv Ryabokin-Rohoza-Rozanov
 Volodymyr Shulhyn, a brother of the Ukrainian statesman Oleksander Shulhyn
 Ivano Hrushetsky, later an Orthodox priest who eventually died in a Soviet prison in August 1940
 Mytrofan Shvydun, later continued to fight on the "Shooter" and "Free Ukraine" armored trains and in 1941 organized the Lutsk Battalion of OUN (Organization of Ukrainian Nationalists)
 Mykhailo Mykhailyk, later wrote a detailed memoir about the battle
 Numerous former students of Kruty became the base of the officer corps of the legendary Black Zaporizhians Cavalry Regiment
 Mykola Kryvopusk and Hnat Martynyuk in 1920-1921 served as personal bodyguards of Symon Petlyura, Martynyuk, after becoming a priest, perished in Volyn in 1943 under unknown circumstances
 Serhiy Zakhvalsky, eventually became an officer in the Polish Army, however, he was renowned for imprisoning a whole company of the Red Army in 1920, while heading one of the cavalry squads of the Zaliznyak Cavalry Regiment
 Averkiy Honcharenko, in 1943 became one of the organizers of the SS Halychyna of which he was appointed a commander in 1945
 Petro Franchuk, one of the members of SS Halychyna

To the memory of the thirties

Gallery

See also

 Kruty Heroes Memorial
 Kyiv Arsenal January Uprising
 Group of forces in fight with counter revolution in the South Russia

Notes

References

External links
 Janiw V. "The Battle of Kruty"
 Montage about the Battle of Kruty
 

 
 
 Життя після Крут. Як склалася доля учасників січневого бою
 www.kruty.org.ua/
 Чому «вороженьки» бояться пам’яті героїв Крут?
 The Battle of Kruty : the free world's first resistance to communism''

Kruty
1918 in Ukraine
Ukrainian People's Republic
Kruty
January 1918 events